Northern Oblast (1918–1920) may refer to:

 Provisional Government of the Northern Region
 Supreme Administration of the Northern Region

1918 establishments in Russia
1918 disestablishments in Russia
1920 disestablishments in Russia
Former administrative units of Russia
Oblasts of Russia